The Party of the Danes (sometimes translated the Danes' Party) was a political party in Denmark. The party described itself as nationalist and ethnopluralist. Many experts and analysts have classified the Party of the Danes as a neo-Nazi party.

The Party of the Danes was founded by Daniel Carlsen and other former members of the National Socialist Movement of Denmark (DNSB) on 10 June 2011.

The party ran for municipal councils in 2013, but did not win any seats. In 2015 it started collecting signatures in order to get on the ballot for the next national election, and in April 2016 the party claimed to have collected half the necessary signatures. On 24 June 2017, the party announced that Daniel Carlsen had decided to retire from politics to concentrate on his family, and that the rest of the leadership therefore had decided to close the party.

Municipal election results

References

2011 establishments in Denmark
Eurosceptic parties in Denmark
Far-right political parties
Nationalist parties in Denmark
Neo-Nazi political parties in Europe
Neo-Nazism in Denmark
Political parties established in 2011
Defunct political parties in Denmark
Far-right politics in Denmark
2017 disestablishments in Denmark